Barikisu Tettey-Quao  (born 28 August 1980) is a Ghanaian footballer who played as a defender for the Ghana women's national football team. She was part of the team at the 1999 FIFA Women's World Cup. On club level she plays for La Ladies in Ghana.

References

External links
 

1980 births
Living people
Ghanaian women's footballers
Ghana women's international footballers
Place of birth missing (living people)
1999 FIFA Women's World Cup players
Women's association football defenders